The English High School in Boston, Massachusetts, founded in 1821, is one of the first public high schools in the United States. Originally called The English Classical School, it was renamed The English High School upon its first relocation in 1824. The current building is located in the Jamaica Plain neighborhood of Boston. The school is a part of Boston Public Schools (BPS).

History
Boston English was created at the urging of the Massachusetts Charitable Mechanics Association and was modeled after the Royal High School in Edinburgh, Scotland. The School Committee to establish English High School was chaired by Samuel Adams Wells, grandson of former Governor Samuel Adams. Its first headmaster was George B. Emerson, an early leader in educational reform. English, like Boston Latin School, only admitted boys when established—although a separate high school for girls was established in Boston by Emerson in 1824. Boston English became coeducational in 1972, 151 years after its founding.

Boston English has had seven locations. Its first site was on Derne Street at the rear of the Massachusetts State House and is marked by a metal plaque. Its second home was a building, which is still standing at the corner of Pinkney and Anderson Streets, which eventually became the Phillips School, a school for then free born and emancipated African-Americans before the American Civil War. From 1844 to 1922, Boston English was adjacent to the Boston Latin School, first near downtown Boston and then in a building (now demolished) on Warren Street in the South End. From 1954 to 1989, Boston English was at 77 Avenue Louis Pasteur, across the street from Boston Latin at 78 Avenue Louis Pasteur. This site is now part of Harvard Medical School.

The motto of the school has been: "The aim of every English High School boy is to become a man of honor and achievement." The current motto of the school is "Honor, Achievement, Service to Mankind".

Curriculum
English High was created originally to educate working-class schoolboys in preparation for business, mechanics, and engineering trades as opposed to "Latin-grammar" schools like Boston Latin that prepared schoolboys for the college, ministry and scholarly pursuits, and private academies that were open only to affluent residents. Its original curriculum consisted of such courses as English, surveying, navigation, geography, logic, and civics as well as a strong emphasis on mathematics.

Nowadays, English High has opened up its curriculum to include more liberal arts subjects such as foreign languages and writing as well as performing arts and more college preparatory courses. It has received an experimental "Commonwealth Co-Pilot School" status, geared toward improving the curriculum of urban schools. For a while, the school had an award-winning mock trial team as well.

English High School has an English-Language Learners program, which was run for many years by Francisco Ruiz.

AVID
This is one of the few schools that offer AVID. AVID is the acronym for Advancement Via Individual Determination, an American college-readiness system. AVID is designed to increase the number of students who enroll in four-year colleges, focusing on students in the academic middle by raising the expectations of students. Originating at the high school level, the program now serves grades 4–12 (roughly, ages 10–18).

Extracurricular activities

Athletics
Each Thanksgiving since 1887, English has played Boston Latin School in football in the oldest continuing high school rivalry in the United States. It is also the fourth longest U.S. high school rivalry of all time. In the 1993 football season, the football team made history by being the first team in school history to ever qualify for the Massachusetts State Championship. The Bulldogs (or Blue & Blue) defeated the Nantucket Whalers by the score of 16–7 to claim its school's first state championship. The '97 football team was the first team to go undefeated with a 12–0 record and English's second football state championship. Since 2005 the baseball team has started by a winning record of 18–0 and defeating their rivals the Brighton Bengals, and since then the baseball team has never let up and has won 2 city championships. English High also has competitive basketball, softball, volleyball, and track teams. Up until the 1980s, the school had a boys' hockey team, a golf team, and swimming teams for both boys and girls. The 1961–1963 football team went 39 and 0 under coach Bill Stewart.

Junior Reserve Officers' Training Corps
This school offers a JROTC program. The program's mission is to motivate students to become better citizens. The program is led by Col. D. Bennett and Command Sergeant Major Hornbuckle. The students participate in drill competitions, community service projects, academic competitions, and town parades to name a few. Selected cadets also attend a summer leadership camp at Fort Devens, MA in place of school for one week in June where they do activities such as obstacle courses, aquatics, rifle marksmanship, and rappelling off of 30 and 60-foot towers. English High JROTC has many partnerships with civic organizations, most notably the Roslindale Parade Committee, the Columbus Day Parade Committee, the City of Boston Veterans Day Committee and the Dorchester Day Parade Committee and the annual Special Olympics at White Stadium in Jamaica Plain.

Notable alumni
 Bruce Bolling - first black president of the Boston City Council
 Benjamin A. Botkin – folklorist
 Robert A. Brooks, 1949, telecommunications pioneer
 Percy Jewett Burrell – dramatist and playwright
 Herb Chambers – automotive dealer
 George W. Coleman – publisher
 Allan Crite – painter
 William Healey Dall – malacologist and explorer of Alaska
 Louis Farrakhan, minister
 Maxwell Finland, physician and infectious diseases expert
 Kahlil Gibran – artist
 Frank Bunker Gilbreth – time and motion engineer
 Bobby Guindon, former MLB player (Boston Red Sox)
 Paul X. Kelley – Commandant of United States Marine Corps, 1983–1987
 Jordan Knight – singer
 Charles W. Lyons – Jesuit and president of several universities
 Samuel Pierpont Langley – director of the Smithsonian Institution
 Bill Meanix – hurdler
 J. P. Morgan – financier
 Leonard Nimoy – actor
 Matthew Ridgway – general
 Mickey Roach – NHL player (Hamilton Tigers)
 Louis Sullivan – architect
 Vito Tamulis – MLB player (New York Yankees, St. Louis Browns, Brooklyn Dodgers, Philadelphia Phillies)
 William H.C. Whiting – Confederate general
 Jerry Colonna – trombonist, actor, comedian, singer and songwriter

Image gallery

References

Further reading
 Annals of The Massachusetts Charitable Mechanics Association, 1795–1892. The Massachusetts Charitable Mechanics Association, Boston, MA.
 Semi-centennial Anniversary of the English High School, May 2, 1871. Robert Cassie Waterston, Editor. Boston: Printed for the English High School Association, 1871
 Annual Report of the School Committee of Boston, Boston, MA, 1820–1821.

External links

 

Educational institutions established in 1821
High schools in Boston
Jamaica Plain, Boston
Public high schools in Massachusetts
1821 establishments in Massachusetts